The 1988 season was the Minnesota Vikings' 28th in the National Football League. They finished with an 11–5 record, and finished second to the Chicago Bears in the NFC Central division.

The Vikings had one of the best defenses in the NFL in 1988. The team allowed 4,091 total yards, 4.3 yards per play, and 243 first downs, all best in the league. The Vikings also had a league-best 53 takeaways. Opposing quarterbacks had a league-worst 41.2 passer rating against the Vikings' defense, the lowest total of the 1980s and fifth all-time for the Super Bowl era.

The Vikings made the postseason for the second consecutive time under coach Jerry Burns. They defeated the Los Angeles Rams in the wildcard round, but lost 34–9 in the divisional round to the San Francisco 49ers, who went on to win their third Super Bowl. This was the last time the Vikings won a playoff game until 1997.

Offseason

1988 Draft

 The Vikings traded their second-round selection (45th overall) to the Denver Broncos in exchange for Denver's second-, fourth- and sixth-round selections (54th, 108th and 164th overall).
 The Vikings traded their fourth- and 11th-round selections (97th and 294th overall) to the New England Patriots for QB Rich Gannon.
 The Vikings traded their sixth-round selection (156th overall) and 1989 10th-round selection (275th overall) to the Miami Dolphins for OL Greg Koch.
 The Vikings traded their 1989 ninth-round selection to the New England Patriots in exchange for the 11th-round selection that the Patriots received in the Gannon trade (296th overall).
 The Vikings traded their 12th-round selection (323rd overall) to the New York Giants in exchange for C Chris Foote.

Supplemental Draft

Staff

Roster

Preseason

Regular season

Schedule

Game summaries

Week 5: at Miami Dolphins

Week 11: at Dallas Cowboys

Standings

Playoffs

Schedule

Game summaries

NFC Wild Card: vs. (#5) Los Angeles Rams

NFC Divisional Playoffs: at (#2) San Francisco 49ers

Statistics

Team leaders

* Vikings single season record

League rankings

References

 Vikings on Pro Football Reference
 Vikings on jt-sw.com

Minnesota Vikings seasons
Minnesota
Minnesota Vikings